Hiti, or Hiti-rau-mea, is a small atoll of the Tuamotu Archipelago in French Polynesia. It is located 19 km southwest of Makemo Atoll.

Hiti Atoll is oval in shape. It measures 9 km in length with a maximum width of 6 km. There are some narrow islands on the northern side of its reef with a total land area of about 3 km2. The southern part of the reef is broader but has no islands. Hiti's lagoon is not connected to the ocean by a pass.

The small group formed by Hiti, Tepoto Sud and Tuanake is also known as the "Raevski Atolls". The Tuamotu reed warbler and the Polynesian ground dove are found in this area.

Hiti Atoll is permanently uninhabited.

History
The first recorded European to arrive to Hiti Atoll was Russian oceanic explorer Fabian Gottlieb von Bellingshausen in 1820.

Administration
Hiti belongs to the commune of Makemo, which consists of the atolls of Makemo, Haraiki, Marutea Nord, Katiu, Tuanake, Hiti, Tepoto Sud, Raroia, Takume, Taenga and Nihiru.

See also

 Desert island
 List of islands

References

External links
Atoll list (in French)
Oceandots
Tuamotu reed-warbler
Polynesian Ground Dove

Atolls of the Tuamotus
Uninhabited islands of French Polynesia